Pterophorus chosokeialis is a moth of the family Pterophoridae. It is found in Vietnam, Thailand, China (Hong Kong, Hainan, Fujian).

References

Moths described in 1922
chosokeialis
Moths of Japan